Åneby Station is a railway station on the Gjøvik Line at Nittedal in Akershus, Norway. The station was opened in 1905 as a stop, three years after the line's opening in 1902. In 1945, the stop was upgraded to a station, but since 1972 the station has been  unmanned and remote controlled. 

Although there are no ticket sales at the station fares may be purchased on the train.

External links 
 Entry at Jernbaneverket <
 Norsk Jernbaneklubb.no  – About Åneby Station

Railway stations on the Gjøvik Line
Railway stations in Nittedal
Railway stations opened in 1905
1905 establishments in Norway